Sesto Marelli is a station on Line 1 of the Milan Metro. The station was opened on 1 November 1964 as part of the inaugural section of the Metro, between Sesto Marelli and Lotto, and it was the terminus of Line 1 until 1986, when the line was extended to Sesto 1º Maggio.

The station is located at the junction between Viale Monza, Viale Tommaso Edison and Viale Ercole Marelli, near the city border with Sesto San Giovanni. However, despite the name Sesto, the station is completely part of the territory of Milan.

This is an underground station with two tracks in a single tunnel.

References

External links

Line 1 (Milan Metro) stations
Railway stations opened in 1964
1964 establishments in Italy
Railway stations in Italy opened in the 20th century